Allen Kelsey Grammer (born February 21, 1955) is an American actor. He gained fame for his role as psychiatrist Dr. Frasier Crane on the NBC sitcom Cheers (1984–1993) and its spin-off Frasier (1993–2004). At nearly 20 years, this is one of the longest-running roles played by a single live-action actor in U.S. television history. He has received numerous accolades including a total of five Emmy Awards, three Golden Globe Awards, a Screen Actors Guild Award, and a Tony Award. He was awarded a star on the Hollywood Walk of Fame in 2000.

Grammer, having trained as an actor at Juilliard and the Old Globe Theatre, made his professional acting debut as Lennox in the 1981 Broadway revival of Macbeth. The following year, he portrayed Cassio acting opposite Christopher Plummer and James Earl Jones in Othello. In 1983, he acted alongside Mandy Patinkin in the original off-Broadway production of Stephen Sondheim's musical Sunday in the Park with George. He's since starred in the leading roles in productions of both Sweeney Todd: The Demon Barber of Fleet Street and My Fair Lady.

On film, he is known for his role as Dr. Hank McCoy / Beast in the superhero film X-Men: The Last Stand (2006). His other roles include Down Periscope (1996), The Pentagon Wars (1998), and Swing Vote (2008). He is also known for his voice roles in Anastasia (1997), Toy Story 2 (1999), and as Sideshow Bob in The Simpsons. He has appeared in the sitcoms 30 Rock, Modern Family, and Unbreakable Kimmy Schmidt. For his role as the corrupt mayor in the political series Boss (2011–2012), he received a Golden Globe Award for Best Actor – Television Series Drama.

In 2010, Grammer returned to Broadway in the musical revival of La Cage aux Folles, where he received a nomination for the Tony Award for Best Leading Actor in a Musical. In 2016, Grammer won a Tony Award for Best Musical as producer of a musical revival of The Color Purple. In 2019, he starred as Don Quixote in a production of Man of La Mancha at the London Coliseum.

Early life
Allen Kelsey Grammer was born on February 21, 1955, in Saint Thomas, U.S. Virgin Islands, to Frank Allen Grammer Jr. (d. 1968), and Sally Cranmer (1928–2008), a singer and actress. His father was a musician, owned a restaurant called Greer's Place, and owned and edited the Virgin Islands View magazine. He had one younger sister, Karen, and four half-siblings from his father's second marriage.

Grammer's personal life had been shaped by many family tragedies. Following his parents' divorce, Grammer was raised in New Jersey, by his mother and maternal grandparents, Gordon and Evangeline Cranmer. The family later moved to Pompano Beach, Florida, and shortly afterwards, when Grammer was twelve years old, his grandfather died of cancer. In 1968, his father was murdered during a wave of racial violence following the assassination of Martin Luther King, Jr. In 1975, his sister was kidnapped, raped, and murdered in Colorado Springs. In 1980, his two teenage half-brothers died in a scuba diving accident.

Grammer attended Pine Crest School, a private preparatory school in Fort Lauderdale, Florida. It was there that he first began to sing and perform on stage. Grammer later won a scholarship to study drama at the Juilliard School, where he was a member of Group 6 from 1973 to 1975. However, after his sister's murder, Grammer failed to attend classes and was eventually expelled. According to his interview with the Cayman Compass in 2019, Grammer described himself as "a Caribbean kid" who "was born in St. Thomas, USVI, and I have been back and forth a lot, gone to the Bahamas a lot, St. John and the Virgin Islands and the BVI."

Career

Theatre 
After leaving Juilliard, Grammer had a three-year internship with the Old Globe Theatre in San Diego in the late 1970s before a stint in 1980 at the Guthrie Theater in Minneapolis, Minnesota. He made his Broadway debut in 1981 as "Lennox" in Macbeth, taking the lead role when Philip Anglim withdrew after receiving negative reviews. Grammer then played Michael Cassio in a Broadway revival of Othello, alongside James Earl Jones and Christopher Plummer. In 1983, he performed in the demo of the Stephen Sondheim–James Lapine production Sunday in the Park with George, starring Mandy Patinkin.

From April to June of 1992, he played the title role in Richard II, staged at the Mark Taper Forum at the Los Angeles Music Center. In 2000, Grammer again played Macbeth on Broadway, in a production that closed after only 10 days.

On April 18, 2010, Grammer made his Broadway musical debut playing the role of Georges in a revival of the Jerry Herman/Harvey Fierstein musical La Cage aux Folles at the Longacre Theatre. Grammer starred alongside Douglas Hodge for which they both were nominated for Tony Awards for Best Performance by a Leading Actor in a Musical. Grammer was said to have been "delivering an assured and charming leading turn."

In March 2015, Grammer originated the roles of Charles Frohman and Captain Hook in the Broadway premiere of the musical Finding Neverland, continuing with the roles through June. He returned to the stage from January 19 to April 3, 2016. Most recently he made an appearance in the West End production of Big Fish. In 2016, Grammer won a Tony Award as a producer of The Color Purple. In 2019, Grammer starred as Don Quixote in a production of Man of La Mancha at the London Coliseum.

Film and television 
In 1984, Grammer first appeared as Dr. Frasier Crane in the NBC sitcom Cheers. Grammer's Broadway co-star and former Juilliard classmate, Mandy Patinkin, suggested Grammer to the New York casting director. He was supposed to appear for only six episodes, but ended up as a regular cast member. The character of Frasier first appears in the third season and continues to appear until the final season of the series in May 1993. Frasier Crane also had a crossover appearance in the 1992 Wings episode "Planes, Trains, & Visiting Cranes." In September 1993, the character became the protagonist of spin-off Frasier. In the show, Frasier has moved from Boston to Seattle and works as a radio psychiatrist alongside his producer Roz (Peri Gilpin). In addition to starring, he also directed more than 30 episodes, and sang the closing theme "Tossed Salads and Scrambled Eggs." In 2001, he negotiated a $700,000-per-episode salary for Frasier. The show was nominated for, and won, numerous awards during its 11-year run, concluding in May 2004.

The show met instant success, and received five Primetime Emmy Awards for Outstanding Comedy Series. This record has never been broken, with Modern Family tying the record. Grammer himself received 10 Primetime Emmy Award nominations for his role in Frasier, winning four times, tying him with Carroll O'Connor, Michael J. Fox and Jim Parsons for the most wins for Primetime Emmy Award for Best Actor in a Comedy Series. His 20-year run playing Dr. Frasier Crane (in both Cheers and Frasier) ties a length set by James Arness in playing Marshal Matt Dillon on Gunsmoke from 1955 to 1975, but it was surpassed by Richard Belzer in playing Det. John Munch on Homicide: Life on the Street and Law & Order: Special Victims Unit since 1993.  In February 2021, it was announced that Grammer would reprise the character in a revival set to air on the streaming service Paramount+.

Grammer has provided the voice of Sideshow Bob on The Simpsons, starting in the 1990 episode "Krusty Gets Busted." He won a fifth Emmy Award for his work in the episode "The Italian Bob." Bob has appeared in twenty-two episodes of the show, the most recent being 2019's "Bobby, It's Cold Outside."

In 1995, Grammer voiced Dr. Frankenollie in the Mickey Mouse short Runaway Brain, and it was nominated for Academy Award for Best Animated Short Film. He later starred in the lead role as Lt. Commander Thomas "Tom" Dodge in the film Down Periscope (1996), and voiced Vladimir "Vlad" Vasilovich in the 20th Century Fox's critically acclaimed animated movie Anastasia (1997). In 1999, Grammer voiced the main antagonist Stinky Pete in Pixar's Golden Globe Award-winning Toy Story 2 (1999). He also provided voice work for several other animated television series and direct-to-video films, such as Barbie of Swan Lake, Bartok the Magnificent, the title character in the short-lived animated series Gary the Rat, and the narrator of Mickey's Once Upon a Christmas. He also voiced Dr. Ivan Krank in Disney's Teacher's Pet (2004).

In 2004, he played Ebenezer Scrooge in the musical television film A Christmas Carol.

Work post-Frasier
In 2005, Grammer returned to television. He produced an American adaptation of the British show The Sketch Show, which aired on Fox. The main cast consisted of Malcolm Barrett, Kaitlin Olson, Mary Lynn Rajskub and Paul F. Tompkins, as well as Lee Mack from the British version of the show. Grammer appeared in only short opening and closing segments in each episode. Many of the sketches from the British version were re-created. Only six episodes of the show were made, and it was cancelled after just four of them had aired.

In 2007, Grammer starred with Patricia Heaton in the American sitcom Back to You, which Fox cancelled after its first season. His next lead role, ABC's Hank, was cancelled after only five episodes had aired. Grammer later commented, "Honestly, it just wasn't very funny."

In 2011 and 2012, Grammer found temporary success in the Starz drama series Boss as a fictional mayor of Chicago, based on former mayor Richard J. Daley. It premiered in October 2011. It was his first dramatic TV series. At the 2012 Golden Globe Awards Grammer won the award for Best Actor in a Television Series Drama for his role. The show ran for 18 episodes over two seasons.

From 2010 to 2012, Grammer guest starred as a comical version of himself in three episodes of the NBC show 30 Rock alongside Jane Krakowski and Jack McBrayer.

In 2014, Grammer returned to sitcom television in Partners with comedian Martin Lawrence. The Lionsgate-produced show was written and executive produced by Robert L. Boyett and Robert Horn, known for writing hit shows like Family Matters, Living Single, Full House, Designing Women, and Perfect Strangers. Despite this, the show was cancelled after its first season. Later that same year, Grammer starred in several films such as Bonaparte in The Expendables 3 (2014) and as Harold Attinger in Transformers: Age of Extinction (2014).

He played the character Buckley in Best of Enemies (2015) and appeared as both the narrator and Herod the Great, in the National Geographic TV film Killing Jesus. More recent work includes a role as Harry Hamilton in the Netflix film Like Father (2018), alongside Kristen Bell, and as a detective opposite Nicolas Cage in Grand Isle (2019).

Other work 
Grammer's voice has been featured in many commercials. In 1998, he appeared in a commercial for Honey Nut Cheerios, where he voices the wolf in Little Red Riding Hood. Since 2006, Grammer has provided the voice for television commercials advertising Hyundai. In 2008, Grammer reprised his role of Dr. Frasier Crane in a commercial for Dr Pepper (Frasier and Cheers co-star Bebe Neuwirth also reprised her role as Lilith Sternin in the same commercial, albeit in voice only).

In 2015 Grammer and John Lithgow lent their voices to the critically acclaimed documentary Best of Enemies as William F. Buckley, Jr. and Gore Vidal, respectively. The documentary surrounds the events around the televised debates between intellectuals Vidal and Buckley during the 1968 United States presidential election. The film premiered at the 2015 Sundance Film Festival and was shortlisted for the Academy Award for Best Documentary but did not make the final cut.

Personal life 
Grammer has been married four times, and has seven children and one grandchild . His first marriage, to dance instructor Doreen Alderman, lasted from 1982 to 1990, although they were separated for the last six years of that period. They have one daughter, actress Spencer Grammer (born October 9, 1983). Through Spencer, Grammer has one grandson, born on October 10, 2011.

After his divorce from Alderman, Grammer had a daughter, Kandace Greer Grammer (born February 15, 1992), with hair and makeup stylist Barrie Buckner. She was later a cast member on MTV's show Awkward.

His second marriage, to Leigh-Anne Csuhany in September 1992, lasted one year. When Csuhany was three months pregnant, Grammer filed for an annulment and evicted her from their home; Grammer claimed she was abusive and fired a gun at him. The pregnancy ended in a miscarriage.

In 1994, he met 28-year-old Tammi Baliszewski at a bar in Manhattan Beach, California. In December 1994, they appeared together on the cover of People magazine, announcing their engagement and Grammer's substance abuse problems.

In August 1997, Grammer married dancer and model Camille Donatacci. They met on a blind date in 1996. They have a daughter, born October 2001, and a son, born August 2004, both born to a surrogate mother. During their marriage, several of Grammer and Donatacci's homes were featured in magazines, including ones in Malibu (February 2001, InStyle), Maui (May 2004, InStyle), Long Island (April 2008, InStyle), Bachelor Gulch (Architectural Digest), and Bel Air, Los Angeles (Architectural Digest). In New York City, they lived at 15 Central Park West. On July 1, 2010, it was announced that Grammer had filed for divorce, citing irreconcilable differences. The pair's divorce was finalized on February 10, 2011.

On August 12, 2010, Grammer announced that he was going to be a father for the fifth time, with girlfriend Kayte Walsh, an English flight attendant 25 years his junior and daughter of former footballer Alan Walsh. However, in October, Grammer announced that Walsh had miscarried six weeks earlier. The couple announced their engagement in December 2010, and married at The Plaza Hotel in New York City on February 25, 2011, two weeks after the dissolution of Grammer's third marriage. Grammer and Walsh have a daughter, born July 2012, and two sons, born July 2014 and November 2016.

On 18 January 2023, it was reported that Grammer had purchased a house in his wife's home town of Portishead, Somerset, England.

Murder of Karen Grammer

On July 1, 1975, Grammer's younger sister, 18-year-old Karen Grammer, was raped and murdered by Freddie Glenn and two other men. Grammer identified his sister's body and informed their mother shortly after. According to Grammer, his bouts of alcoholism and drug abuse were fueled, in part, by guilt and depression due to his sister's death, as the pair had been close in childhood. 

In a 2012 interview with Oprah Winfrey, Grammer said he would be willing to forgive the perpetrators if they would take responsibility for the crime, though they all claimed innocence. In the same interview, Grammer expressed his loss of faith for several years after Karen's death. He subsequently forgave Glenn in a 2014 parole hearing after being convinced of Glenn's contrition, but refused to support his release, saying that it would "be a betrayal of my sister's life." He named his daughter Spencer Karen Grammer in part for his sister. 

Karen Grammer's murder and the investigation by the Colorado Springs Police Department was the subject of the episode "Animal Nature" of the Investigation Discovery series Homicide Hunter.

Politics 

Grammer is a supporter of the Republican Party and endorses the Tea Party movement on economic issues such as small government and lower taxes; City A.M. described him as "one of Hollywood's best-known Republicans, a rare spark of red in a blue sea of Democrats."

A New York magazine profile published in 2010 described him as pro-choice. In 2015, however, his wife posted an Instagram photo of Grammer wearing a T-shirt from the anti-abortion group Abort73.

Grammer is supportive of same-sex marriage, stating "I think marriage is up to two people who love each other." He has expressed disbelief on the scientific consensus on climate change, comparing the California wildfires to alleged global cooling from his youth and criticized the 2011 and 2018 climate meetings. Additionally, he stated in a 2016 interview with The Guardian that the person he admired most was Vladimir Putin "because he is so comfortably who he is." In 2019, he issued a controversial statement in support of Britain leaving the European Union.

Grammer has labeled Washington politicians a "bunch of clowns." He has expressed an interest in some day running for United States Congress, Mayor of New York City, and the presidency. In an interview with radio talk show host Frank Morano in August of 2021, he indicated that he was no longer interested in running for office. Grammer was a guest at President George W. Bush's first inauguration. Grammer endorsed Rudy Giuliani in the 2008 presidential primary and later campaigned for John McCain in the general election. Grammer also promoted RightNetwork, a conservative start-up American television network. He endorsed Michele Bachmann for the Republican nomination for president in 2012. Grammer later endorsed Mitt Romney, after he had won the nomination. He supported Ben Carson's candidacy for the Republican presidential nomination in 2016, although voiced support for Donald Trump when the latter was elected.

Health problems 
Grammer has a history of substance abuse. In 1988, Grammer was charged with drunk driving and cocaine possession and sentenced to 30 days in jail. In August 1990, Grammer was charged again with cocaine possession and was sentenced to three years' probation, fined $500, and required to perform 300 hours of community service. In January 1991, Grammer was given an additional two years' probation for violating his original probation through additional cocaine use. In September 1996, he crashed his Dodge Viper while intoxicated, and subsequently checked into the Betty Ford Center (an alcohol rehabilitation clinic) for 30 days. Grammer's personal problems affected his work. The cast and producers of both Frasier and Cheers held interventions to help him; co-star Bebe Neuwirth and writer Ken Levine cited delays with rehearsals and filming due to his erratic behavior. Writer Dan O'Shannon recalled, however, that

Grammer credits his religion for helping him through with his struggles with alcohol and drug use, as well as his personal tragedies.

On May 31, 2008, while paddleboarding with his then-wife Camille in Hawaii, Grammer experienced a heart attack. Their personal assistant, Scott MacLean, was essential in saving his life. Grammer was discharged on June 4, 2008, and was said to be "resting comfortably" at his Hawaiian residence. Seven weeks after the attack, Grammer told Entertainment Tonight that, although his spokesman described the attack as mild, it was in fact more severe as his heart had stopped. Grammer thought Fox's decision to cancel his TV sitcom Back to You contributed to his health problems, stating, "It was a very stressful time for me, and a surprise that it was cancelled. But you know, everything that doesn't kill us—which it almost did—makes us stronger!"

Criminal convictions
In 1988, Grammer was arrested for possession of one-quarter gram of cocaine, after being pulled over in a traffic stop for driving with expired plates in North Hollywood. A year earlier, he had been arrested for a DUI in Van Nuys, and would go on to serve 14 days of a 30-day sentence. Grammer later served 10 days of community service after failing to comply with the requirements of his parole in 1990. Later in the same year, Grammer was sentenced to 90 days of house arrest, ordered to pay a $500 fine, underwent drug and alcohol abuse counseling, and performed 300 hours of community service for his 1988 cocaine possession case.

Legal matters
In 1995, Grammer was accused of sleeping with his child's underage babysitter. A grand jury chose not to indict the actor, stating, "The young woman's delay of more than a year in pressing charges against Mr. Grammer made it difficult to support her claim." Grammer released a statement shortly afterwards, saying, "I have said from the outset that there was no basis for the allegations." In 1996, Grammer's ex-girlfriend, Cerlette Lamme, sued him for defamation of character and invasion of privacy over content he included in his autobiography So Far.... In 1998, Grammer filed a lawsuit against Internet Entertainment Group (IEG), which Grammer claimed had stolen from his home a videotape of him sleeping with a woman. IEG counter-sued Grammer, denying it was in possession of such a tape, and Grammer's suit was eventually dropped. IEG President Seth Warshavsky later said, "We have been presented with another Kelsey Grammer tape. But we have no plans to air it. We are still evaluating it at this time."

Filmography

Film

Television

Theatre

Video games

Production work

Director

Producer

Awards and nominations 

Grammer won numerous awards and accolades, particularly for his work on Frasier. He was the first American actor to be nominated for multiple Emmy awards for portraying the same character on three different television shows (Cheers, Frasier, and Wings). In 2010, Grammer received his first Tony Award nomination for Best Actor in a Musical for his performance in La Cage Aux Folles opposite Douglas Hodge. He later won the Best Revival of a Musical, as a producer for The Color Purple, in 2016. On May 22, 2001, he was presented with a star on the Hollywood Walk of Fame for television. He received a nomination from the Directors Guild of America Award in 1999, for directing the Frasier episode "Merry Christmas, Mrs. Moskowitz." At the Golden Globes, he has received nine nominations and won three.

References

Further reading 
 Grammer, Kelsey. So Far.... New York: Viking Press, 1995. Print. . . His Autobiography.

External links 

 
 
 
 

1955 births
Living people
20th-century American male actors
21st-century American male actors
American soap opera actors
American male comedians
American male film actors
American male musical theatre actors
American male stage actors
American male television actors
American male video game actors
American male voice actors
American people convicted of drug offenses
American people of British descent
American people of United States Virgin Islands descent
American television directors
Audiobook narrators
Television producers from California
Best Drama Actor Golden Globe (television) winners
Best Musical or Comedy Actor Golden Globe (television) winners
California Republicans
Comedians from California
Comedians from New York City
Juilliard School alumni
Male actors from Beverly Hills, California
Male actors from New York City
New York (state) Republicans
Outstanding Performance by a Lead Actor in a Comedy Series Primetime Emmy Award winners
People from Manhattan
People from Saint Thomas, U.S. Virgin Islands
Daytime Emmy Award winners
United States Virgin Islands male actors
Tony Award winners
Television producers from New York City
20th-century American comedians
21st-century American comedians
Former Christian Scientists
Pine Crest School alumni